

Events 
 May – Luzzasco Luzzaschi is appointed assistant organist at the Este court in Ferrara.
20 December – Virtuoso bass-tenor Alessandro Merlo joins the Cappella Sistina in Rome
date unknown –
 Rodrigo de Ceballos succeeds Bernardino de Figueroa as maestro de capilla at the Royal Chapel of Granada.
 Philibert Jambe de Fer sues the Lyonnais printer Jean d'Ogerelles for failing to give his name on the title page of a volume of his psalm settings.

Publications 
Il terzo libro della muse, a collection of secular music
Jacques Arcadelt –  (Paris: Le Roy & Ballard)
Jacquet de Berchem –  for four voices (Venice: Antonio Gardano), a madrigal cycle setting stanzas of Orlando Furioso, and the first musical work to be titled "Cappricio"
Ippolito Chamaterò – First book of madrigals for four voices (Venice: Antonio Gardano)
Ippolito Ciera – First book of madrigals for five voices (Venice: Antonio Gardano)
Nicolao Dorati – Third book of madrigals for five voices (Venice: Antonio Gardano)
Jacquet of Mantua
Jacobus de Kerle
 (Book of Vespers Psalms) for four voices (Venice: Antonio Gardano)
First book of Magnificats for four voices (Venice: Antonio Gardano)
Gerardus Mes –  (Antwerp: Tielman Susato), a collection of psalms
Jan Nasco – Lamentations for four voices (Venice: Antonio Gardano)
Christoph Praetorius –  for five voices (Wittenberg), a wedding motet

Births 
January 24 – Camillo Cortellini, Italian composer, singer, and violinist (died 1630)
July 17 – Jacopo Corsi, Italian composer and patron of the arts (died 1602)
August – Sebastian Aguilera de Heredia, Spanish monk, organist and composer (died 1627)
August 20 – Jacopo Peri, Italian singer and composer of early opera (died 1633)
date unknown – Juan Blas de Castro, Spanish singer, musician, and composer (died 1631)
probable
Elias Mertel, German lutenist, composer and intabulator (died 1626)
Peter Philips (c.1560/1561), eminent English composer, organist, and Catholic priest (died 1628), the most published English composer in his time
Philippe Rogier, Franco-Flemish composer at the Spanish court (died 1596)

Deaths 
February 15 – Cornelius Canis, Franco-Flemish composer, singer, and choir director (born c.1500/1510)
date unknown – Jan Nasco, Franco-Flemish composer and writer on music (born c.1510)
probable
Loys Bourgeois, French composer, famous for his Protestant hymn tunes (born c.1510)
Ippolito Ciera, Italian composer
Luis de Milán, Spanish Renaissance composer, vihuelist and writer on music (born c.1500)
Hendrik Niehoff, Dutch pipe organ builder (born 1495)

References 

 
Music
16th century in music
Music by year